The 2011 North Carolina A&T Aggies football team represented North Carolina A&T State University as a member of Mid-Eastern Athletic Conference (MEAC) during the 2011 NCAA Division I FCS football season. Led by first-year head coach Rod Broadway, the Aggies compiled an overall record of 5–6 with a mark of 4–4 in conference play, tying for sixth place in the MEAC. North Carolina A&T played home games at Aggie Stadium in Greensboro, North Carolina.

Schedule

Game summaries

Virginia–Lynchburg
.

Appalachian State
.

Coastal Carolina
.

References

North Carolina AandT
North Carolina A&T Aggies football seasons